Vincenzo Sospiri (born 7 October 1966) is an Italian former racing driver.

Early career
In 1981, at the age of 15, Sospiri started racing in the Italian 100cc karting championship. In a karting career described by Michael Schumacher as 'dominating', Sospiri won several Italian and European karting championships and finished runner-up in several more, eventually winning the 100cc World Karting Championship in 1987.

In 1988 Sospiri progressed to Formula Ford, before working through to Formula 3000 in 1991, as teammate to Damon Hill in the Middlebridge Lola T91/50 Cosworth. In an uncompetitive car, he was only capable of 9 points all season, including a second place at the German round of the championship at the Hockenheimring. He stepped back down into the Italian F3 series in 1992, before making a return to Formula 3000 in 1993, driving a Reynard 93D Judd for the Mythos team. He moved to the Super Nova team for 1994 and mounted a challenge for the championship despite not winning any races, eventually finishing fourth. He stayed at Super Nova for 1995 where he won three races and beat his teammate Ricardo Rosset to the F3000 title.

Sospiri revealed, in a 2022 YouTube interview with a fan, that his biggest heroes in racing were Ayrton Senna and Dan Gurney, for whom he would later drive.

Formula One

He had tested for the Simtek Formula One team at Estoril in 1994, but was unable to raise enough funds to gain a race seat at the time. Despite winning the Formula 3000 title in 1995, very few options were available for Sospiri, so he chose to take the role of official Benetton test driver for the year.

Unfortunately it was clear from the first race, where both Sospiri and his former F3000 teammate Ricardo Rosset were more than 10 seconds off the pace and failed to qualify after being well outside the 107% rule, that the car was not capable of making the grid in a world championship race. Sospiri hoped to return to the grid in Brazil, but the team was withdrawn due to the massive debts incurred by its failing Formula One effort.

After Formula One

IndyCar and Champ Car
After the collapse of Mastercard-Lola, Sospiri turned his attention to the Indy Racing League IndyCar Series where he signed on with Team Scandia to race in the 1997 Indianapolis 500. Sospiri put the Scandia Dallara-Oldsmobile third on the starting grid in his first IndyCar start and finished 17th in the race. Later that season he finished second at the New Hampshire Motor Speedway. He finished 21st in the championship despite only competing in six of the ten races of the 1996-1997 season. In 1998 Sospiri was brought on to Dan Gurney's All American Racers team as a late-season replacement for P. J. Jones and drove in the final four races of the season for the team. He had a best finish of 15th at both Houston and Surfers Paradise and failed to finish in the points as the team's struggles continued. He was named to an ISM Racing entry for the 1999 Indianapolis 500 but the car was driven by Brian Tyler instead, who failed to qualify.

Sports cars and team ownership
In 1998 and 1999, he won the Sports Racing World Cup with a Ferrari 333 SP, teaming up with Emmanuel Collard. This resulted in a drive in the lead Toyota at the 1999 24 Hours of Le Mans with Collard and Martin Brundle. Unfortunately, frequent gearbox problems and a puncture while Brundle was driving took the polesitter out of the race. He retired from racing in 2001 and is now the team manager for Vincenzo Sospiri Racing.

Legacy
Sospiri was a major inspiration for Michael Schumacher. In a Q&A session with F1 Racing readers in 2012, when asked about his racing heroes, Schumacher replied: "To start with, it was Vincenzo Sospiri. Then it was Ayrton Senna. Those two guys inspired me big time while I was karting".

Racing record

Complete International Formula 3000 results
(key) (Races in bold indicate pole position) (Races 
in italics indicate fastest lap)

Complete Formula One results
(key)

Complete Formula Nippon results
(key) (Races in bold indicate pole position) (Races in italics indicate fastest lap)

American open-wheel racing results
(key) (Races in bold indicate pole position)

IndyCar

Indy 500 results

CART

Complete 24 Hours of Le Mans results

References

External links

Profile at F1 Rejects

1966 births
Living people
People from Forlì
Italian racing drivers
Italian Formula One drivers
MasterCard Lola Formula One drivers
International Formula 3000 Champions
IndyCar Series drivers
Indianapolis 500 drivers
Champ Car drivers
Formula Nippon drivers
International Formula 3000 drivers
British Formula 3000 Championship drivers
Formula Ford drivers
24 Hours of Le Mans drivers
EFDA Nations Cup drivers
Sportspeople from the Province of Forlì-Cesena
Toyota Gazoo Racing drivers
Sports car racing team owners
Super Nova Racing drivers